Two spot barb is a common name for several fish and may refer to:

Pethia cumingii
Pethia ticto
Puntius bimaculatus